Joseph O'Shaughnessey (died 1783) was an Irish Chief of the Name.

Joseph was the eldest son of the previous chief, Roebuck, and had siblings William, Mary, Catherine, Ellice, Elleanor, all alive in 1784. He and his family, along with the local gentry, forcibly gained possession of the former family mansion on the square of Gort, around 1760. The occasion caused much jubilation, with the church bells of Athenry and Galway ringing in support. However, he was never able to gain legal possession, and died without gaining the ancient family property.

Joseph died in 1783 without issue, though his brother and sisters were apparently still alive. The succession of the senior line becomes unclear after this point.

References

 D'Alton, John, Illustrations, Historical and Genealogical, of King James's Irish Army List (1689). Dublin: 1st edition (single volume), 1855. pp. 328–32.
 History of Galway, James Hardiman, 1820
 Tabular pedigrees of O'Shaughnessy of Gort (1543–1783), Martin J. Blake, Journal of the Galway Archaeological and Historical Society, vi (1909–10), p. 64; vii (1911–12), p. 53.
 John O'Donovan. The Genealogies, Tribes, and Customs of Hy-Fiachrach. Dublin: Irish Archaeological Society. 1844. Pedigree of O'Shaughnessy: pp. 372–91.
 Old Galway, Professor Mary Donovan O'Sullivan, 1942
 Galway: Town and Gown, edited Moran et al., 1984
 Galway: History and Society, 1996

People from County Galway
18th-century Irish people
Joseph
1783 deaths
Year of birth unknown